U-132 may refer to one of the following German submarines:

 , a Type U 127 submarine laid down during the First World War but unfinished at the end of the war; broken up incomplete 1919–20
 During the First World War, Germany also had this submarine with a similar name:
 , a Type UB III submarine launched in 1918 and that served in the First World War until surrendered on 21 November 1918; broken up at Swansea
 , a Type VIIC submarine that served in the Second World War until sunk 4 November 1942

Submarines of Germany